The Antafia sportive lemur, or red-shouldered sportive lemur (Lepilemur aeeclis) is a sportive lemur endemic to Madagascar. The AEECL's sportive lemur is found in western Madagascar, living in dry deciduous forests.

It is unusual in having a specific name based on an acronym.

See also 
Other species with acronym-derived names:
 Apterichtus ansp 
 Klossiella quimrensis
 Turbonilla musorstom

References

Sportive lemurs
Mammals described in 2017